

List

See also 
 Transport in Antarctica
 Research stations in Antarctica

References

External links
 
  - includes IATA codes
 Airports in Antarctica Great Circle Mapper
 Airports in Antarctica World Aero Data
 Antarctic facilities in operation COMNAP
 Antarctic Digital Database Map Viewer SCAR

Antarctica

Airports